The Skirmish at Aenon Church was a battle that was fought between the Union Army and the Confederate Army in Hanover County, Virginia on May 29, 1864.  The battle resulted a Confederate victory.

References

Aenon Church
Aenon Church
Conflicts in 1864
1864 in Virginia
May 1864 events
Hanover County in the American Civil War